"From Sarah with Love" is a song by German recording artist Sarah Connor. It was co-written and produced by Rob Tyger and Kay Denar and Connor for her debut studio album, Green Eyed Soul (2001). The title of the song is inspired by the James Bond movie From Russia with Love. Released as the album's third single on 5 November 2001, it peaked at number one in the Czech Republic, Germany, and Switzerland and reached the top three in Austria and Finland. "From Sarah with Love" was nominated for Best National (i.e. German) Single – Rock/Pop at the 2002 ECHO Awards and received a triple gold certification from the German arm of the International Federation of the Phonographic Industry.

Formats and track listings

Charts

Weekly charts

Year-end charts

Decade-end charts

Certifications

References

External links
 SarahConnor.com – official site

2001 singles
2001 songs
Epic Records singles
Number-one singles in the Czech Republic
Number-one singles in Germany
Number-one singles in Switzerland
Sarah Connor (singer) songs
Songs written by Rob Tyger
Songs written by Kay Denar
X-Cell Records singles